The Tajiks of Xinjiang (Sarikoli: ,), also known as Chinese Tajiks or Mountain Tajiks, are Pamiris that live in the Pamir mountains of Taxkorgan Tajik Autonomous County, in Xinjiang, China. They are one of the 56 ethnic groups officially recognized by the Chinese government. Most speak a variety of Eastern Iranian; the majority speak Sarikoli while a minority speak Wakhi.

Name

Despite the name by which they are known in China, the Tajiks of Xinjiang are not the same as the Tajik people (who speak the Tajik language). The Tajiks of Xinjiang are an extension of the Pamiri people, a different Iranian group who speak the indigenous Eastern Iranian Pamiri languages.

History

Early period
Tashkurgan Town became the capital of the Sarikol kingdom, a kingdom of the Pamir Mountains in the Taxkorgan Tajik Autonomous County.

Medieval period
Xinjiang and its eastern Iranian-speaking peoples underwent gradual Turkification caused by the conquests and settlements of Turkic peoples like the Uyghurs and Qarakhanids. By the Mongol period, most of these eastern Iranian peoples were assimilated into the Turkic community. The Tajiks of Xinjiang claim to be descended from the remaining Eastern Iranians who still resided in the mountainous region of Xinjiang. This claim is seemingly supported by medieval Chinese literature, documents and modern archaeological evidence.

Conversion to Nizari Ismailism
According to oral tradition, Nasir Khusraw led a mission to the region with four of his disciples: Sayyid Hassan Zarrabi, Sayyid Surab Wali, Sayyid Jalal Bukhari and Jahan Malikshah. Khusraw purportedly told some of his disciples to settle down in the area to continue to aid and preach to the local converts about Ismailism. Many current pirs (holy men) claim descent from these early disciples.

Qing dynasty
During the Qing dynasty , the Tajiks were administered by a system of Begs like the rest of Xinjiang. During the Qing dynasty rule, the Chinese claimed suzerainty over the Taghdumbash Pamir in the south west of Xinjiang, in today's Tashkurgan Tajik Autonomous County but permitted the Mir of Hunza to administer the region in return for their tributes to China. The Hunzai's were tributaries and allies to China, acknowledging China as suzerain since 1761.

The Tajiks of Xinjiang practiced slavery, selling some of their own as a punishment. Submissive slaves were given wives and settled with the Tajiks. They were considered property and could be sold anytime. Their slaves came from numerous sources, enslaving Sunni captives such as Kirghiz in retaliation for Kirghiz slave raids against the Tajiks since the Kirghiz sold them into slavery in these raids or from Hunza (also known as Khujund), Gilgit and Chitral. Slaves from Chitral and Kunjud passed through there to Bukhara. The Sunnis called them Rafidites and did not consider them Muslim (as enslaving fellow Muslims is contrary to Sharia law).

There were hundreds of slaves sold by Tajiks. Most foreign slaves in Xinjiang were Shia Mountain Tajiks, they were referred to by Sunni Turkic Muslims as Ghalcha. Shia Mountain Tajik Ghalchas made up the majority of slave trafficked and sold in Xinjiang to the Sunni Muslim Turkic inhabitants and they were seen as foreigners and strangers. Serfs were treated in a "wretched" manner.

An anti-Russian uproar broke out when Russian customs officials, 3 Cossacks and a Russian courier invited local Turki Muslim (Uyghur) prostitutes to a party in January 1902 in Kashgar, this caused a massive brawl by the inflamed local Turki Muslim populace against the Russians on the pretense of protecting Muslim women because there was anti-Russian sentiment being built up, even though morality was not strict in Kashgar, the local Turki Muslims violently clashed with the Russians before they were dispersed, the Chinese sought an end to tensions to prevent the Russians from building up a pretext to invade.

After the riot, the Russians sent troops to Sarikol in Tashkurghan and demanded that the Sarikol postal services be placed under Russian supervision, the locals of Sarikol believed that the Russians would seize the entire district from the Chinese and send more soldiers even after the Russians tried to negotiate with the Begs of Sarikol and sway them to their side, they failed since the Sarikoli officials and authorities demanded in a petition to the Amban of Yarkand that they be evacuated to Yarkand to avoid being harassed by the Russians and objected to the Russian presence in Sarikol, the Sarikolis did not believe the Russian claim that they would leave them alone and only involved themselves in the mail service.

Republic of China

In the mid-1940s around 9,000 Tajiks Sarikolis lived in Xinjiang while others moved to other Central Asian countries and provinces of China. During the Ili Rebellion from 1944 to 1949, Uyghur forces butchered the livestock of the Tajiks as they advanced south. Uyghurs insurgents who were backed by Soviets destroyed Tajik crops and acted aggressively against the Tajiks and Kirghiz of China.

Distribution
The population of Tajiks in China numbered 41,028 in 2000 and 50,265 (Xinjiang only) in 2015. They are located in China's Western Xinjiang region with 60% living in Tashkurgan Tajik Autonomous County. Despite the name "Tajik" that is used to refer to them, the Tajiks of China do not speak the Tajik language. Early 20th-century travelers to the region referred to them as Sarikoli, "Mountain Tajiks," or Ghalcha. As of 2015–16, more than four thousand Mountain Tajiks lived in nearby Poskam County (Zepu). Some Mountain Tajiks live in Kokyar (Kekeya), Kargilik County (Yecheng). Tar Township in Akto County, Kizilsu Kyrgyz Autonomous Prefecture, is a Tajik township.

Language
In China, the languages of the Tajik people have no official written form. The great majority speak the Sarikoli language, which has been heavily influenced by Chinese, Uyghur and Wakhi. A small proportion speaks the Wakhi language. Sarikoli and Wakhi are Iranian languages, commonly classified in the Pamir or Eastern Iranian areal groups.

Religion

The Mountain Tajiks in China are adherents of Nizari Ismaili sect of Shia Islam and are still a little isolated from the rest of the worldwide Ismaili community, though their communication with other Pamiri (Ismaili) peoples has never stopped. The Chinese authorities allow a few Ismaili religious buildings to function in Xinjiang's Tajik Autonomous District, whose clerics were appointed by the Chinese secular authorities. Restrictions by the Chinese government bars foreign Ismaili preachers from openly working among the Tajiks in China and the religious leader of the Nizari Ismaili sect, the Aga Khan, was once barred from business with the China's Ismailis.

From 2–4 April 2012, Aga Khan (Aga Khan IV) paid an official visit to Ürümqi, Xinjiang, China, at the invitation of the Governor of the Xinjiang Uyghur Autonomous Region, Nur Bekri, to discuss collaboration between the Aga Khan Development Network (AKDN) and the autonomous government of Xinjiang. Governor Bekri held talks in the meeting and agreed to collaborate in several thematic areas of mutual interest, including poverty alleviation, education, tourism investment and financial services. The Aga Khan IV had last visited China in 1981.

China's Tajiks have been caught up in the country's crackdown on Muslims that has taken place since 2017, despite the fact that they have not tended to be politically active and the repressions have mainly targeted Uighurs. Only a single mosque is allowed to operate in the Tajik region and children under 18 are not permitted to attend it.

Culture

Family life 
In an average traditional family, at least three or more generations of relatives live under the same household. There's also a hierarchy which is determined by a family member's age and gender but the senior male stands as the head of the family. The responsibilities of the men tend to be providing for the family and looking after the children and elderly. The women's responsibilities are to raise the children, do household duties, and to attend to the elderly. The senior male is in charge of managing the entire household and the family's wealth through consulting with the rest of the men in the house. The young men are discouraged from seeking an independent life outside the household unless they get consent from the family. Failure to do so can forfeit them from inheritance.

Rites of passage and life cycles 
Marriages are usually arranged by the parents of the prospective groom and bride from the asking of the daughter's hand up to the wedding. The families of the couple also decide on the dowry amount, plan the engagements and wedding dates, and choose who can attend. Some three days before the wedding, the families come together and initiate a feast for the people in the area who have lost relatives in the last year or so. These people then approve of the celebration by tapping on a hand drum. Funerals are conducted by first doing the Islamic rites of cleansing the body and praying for the deceased. This is followed by the family who burn incense and close any room or ceiling windows as this is believed to purify the path for the deceased. Every family member is expected to attend the funeral or make up for it with a visit to the family. For forty days after the burial, the closest relatives of the deceased will begin to abstain from personal comforts like by keeping their hair unkempt or uncut. On the last day, friends and family come together to bathe and clean the mourners and to convince them to return to their daily lives.

Festivals and rituals 
The two main celebrations of the Tajiks of Xinjiang are the Nowruz (Persian New Year) and the Pilik festival. Right before Nowruz or "ched chader" in Sariqoli (meaning cleaning the house') begins, families rigorously clean their homes and sprinkle the inner walls with putuk (wheat flour) to wish for a successful year. Each household bakes a cake for the occasion to share with guests. The guests are welcomed on the doorstep by dusting some putuk on their right shoulder. Pilik is dedicated to commemorate the dead. Families light candles and pray for the souls of the dead while circling the light and pulling the flame towards their face. This ritual lasts two days. On the first day, families light candles inside the house. On the second day, they visit the local cemetery and light a candle for each deceased relative and place it on their graves.

Seasonal rituals like the Zuwur zoht (irrigation) and Teghm zuwost (seed sowing) used to be commonplace but presently a pir (a local religious master) or khalifa (a religious functionary who trained under a pir) blesses the agricultural implements in the fields by reciting verses from the Quran.

Livelihood 
Because of the harsh and scarce environment in which the locals live in, they mostly rely on cultivating whatever arable land is available and engage in small-scale animal husbandry. Other types of subsistence also include selling traditional embroidery, clothes, hats, and other arts and crafts. However, this is only a seasonal operation. There are also a few governmental wages available but salaried jobs are few and the demand is very high.

Notable people 
 (1935–1973), poet
Wu Tianyi (born 1937), medical scientist, member of the Chinese Academy of Engineering
 (born 1941), poet and writer
 (born 1964), politician, Member of the 12th National People's Congress
 (born 1977), politician
 (1979–2021), soldier and politician, Member of the 13th National People's Congress

References

External links 
 The Tajik ethnic minority (China) (government website, in English)

 
Ethnic groups in Xinjiang
Xinjiang
Muslim communities of China
Ethnic groups officially recognized by China